Colony is an original novel based on the U.S. television series Buffy the Vampire Slayer. This novel is part of the line of Buffy books called "Stake your Own Destiny". These books give the reader a large series of choices, once a choice is made, the page number to turn to is given. The result is that the reader might decide the fate of the characters. With this novel, there are more than a dozen possible endings.

Plot summary
Mayor Richard Wilkins III invites a woman named Belakane to speak at the local Sunnydale High School. She has a program, "Be the Ultimate You!". It aims to build self-esteem in teenagers. However, she is a demon ant-like queen and her so-called self-esteem program is actually a test to find workers to build her colony, and to find mates to expand her populace. She soon reduces students to single trait beings, for example Buffy is reduced to 'aggressive slayer'.

External links

Reviews
Teen-books.com - Reviews of this book

2005 American novels
Books based on Buffy the Vampire Slayer
Gamebooks